During the 1996–97 English football season, Crewe Alexandra F.C. competed in the Football League Second Division, in their 74th season in the English Football League.

Season summary
In the 1996–97 season, Crewe had a great season by reaching the play-offs by finishing in the final play-off position, which was achieved on the final day by earning a 1–1 draw at York that was required as Blackpool had scored more goals which meant knowing a defeat and a Blackpool win at Wrexham would see Crewe slip out of the top six and Blackpool would have still had a chance of promotion. Blackpool though lost 2–1 so it didn't matter in the end with Crewe's result. In the play-offs, they beat Luton, who just missed out on automatic promotion, 4–3 on aggregate to get to Wembley and achieved promotion with a 1–0 win against Brentford.

Final league table

Results
Crewe Alexandra's score comes first

Legend

Football League Second Division

Second Division play-offs

FA Cup

League Cup

Football League Trophy

Squad

References

Crewe Alexandra F.C. seasons
Crewe Alexandra